William Henry Traill (7 May 1842 – 21 May 1902) was an Australian journalist and politician, commonly referred to as W. H. Traill. He was an early editor and for a period the principal proprietor of The Bulletin in Sydney.

Early life
Traill, only son of John Traill of Westove, Orkney Islands, and his wife Eliza Dunbar (née Heddle) was born in London, and was educated at Edinburgh and London. The Westove Estate had been held by Traill descendants for more than 300 years. Originally intended for the army, he emigrated to Australia when 17 years of age, landed at Sydney, went to Brisbane, and then became a jackeroo on Boondoomba Station near Dalby. About two years later he was left a small patrimony and returned to the Orkney Islands. He stayed for only a few months, and going again to Queensland, became manager of the Maroon Estate in the Beaudesert district. He did not stay long in this position but visited Melbourne and joined the mines department, then returned to Queensland and was given a position in the lands department.

Journalism
He began doing journalistic work, contributing a regular column headed Passing Thoughts to the Express, while a special commissioner investigating the land dummying being carried on in connection with the opening up of the Darling Downs. In 1871 he married Agnes Lewis, half-sister of his first wife. In 1869 gave up his position to work on the staff of the Brisbane Courier. He subsequently purchased the Darling Downs Gazette, but returned to the Courier'''s literary staff in late 1873 when Gresley Lukin became part proprietor and managing editor. Traill served as editor of The Queenslander from late 1873 until late 1878 when he moved with his family to Sydney to take up the editorship of The Sydney Mail. He held this position for about a year, resigning to become Reuter's agent for New South Wales. He continued to contribute to The Sydney Mail, Echo and The Sydney Morning Herald. At the end of January 1880 The Bulletin was started and Traill began contributing leaders to it. As the result of libel actions against that journal it fell into the hands of its printer. He sold it to Traill who met Archibald and Haynes, the original proprietors, and agreed with them to transfer a fourth interest to each of them on similar terms to those of the sale to him. They agreed to work together to make the Bulletin a success, but soon afterwards Haynes and Archibald were imprisoned for failing to pay the costs of the Clontarf libel action, and Traill became editor.

He fixed its political policy, "land nationalisation and protection, championed the Irish home rule case ... and took a very practical interest in its welfare—from the production of a brilliantly-written unanswerable leader, to the phlegmatic explosions of an obsolete gas engine". (J. F. Archibald, the Lone Hand, September 1907). Having handed over the editorship to Archibald, Traill in 1883 went to America and engaged Livingston Hopkins ("Hop") as a comic draughtsman, and about two years later travelled to England and engaged Phil May for similar work. These two men did remarkable work, and were largely responsible for the success of the Bulletin.

Parliamentary career
In April 1886 Traill sold his interest in the Bulletin and in 1889, he was elected a member of the Legislative Assembly for South Sydney. He was committed to protectionism, but otherwise was an independent and was not offered a ministry. He held a position as chairman of the commission to enquire into the working of the New South Wales Lands Office. He was defeated in 1895 and afterwards was engaged unsuccessfully in pastoral and mining pursuits in New South Wales and Queensland and declared bankrupt in 1896.

Towards the end of his life he lived at Brisbane and wrote for the Queensland government, A Queenly Colony, published in 1901, and the historical and mining portion of the Queensland Year Book 1902. He died of heart disease at his residence at Yeerongpilly in Brisbane in 1902 at the age of 58. He was twice married and left a widow, four sons and three daughters.

 Personal 
On 23 April 1866 Traill married singer Jessie  Lewis (c. 1843 – 19 February 1867), daughter of James Lewis and Mary Ann Lewis (c. 1819 – 23 August 1894 at "Cliffside", Watsons Bay, NSW), of Escrick, near York, England. She died of consumption at her home, Armagh cottage, Kangaroo Point, Queensland. They had one daughter. The journalist Pattie Lewis, aka Mrs James Fotheringhame ("Mab" of the Bulletin), was a sister.
Millie Traill (10 March 1867 – 3 August 1957), a musician. She married Forster Heddle in London on 7 November 1899. moved to Canada in 1941
Traill married again, to his wife's sister, Agnes Lewis (c. 1855 – 17 May 1930) around 1870. They had around eight children, including 
Thomas Traill Fotheringham Westove Traill, usually T. T. F. Traill (29 October 1871 – 14 March 1939) married Margaret Province of "Wonbah station" on 29 December 1902. He was a grazier of "Cynthia station" and "Culcraigie", Eidsvold.

James Lewis "Jim" Traill (24 March 1874 – 20 June 1909) part-owner of Traill Bros, process engravers,

Walter Harold Traill (13 November 1879 – c. 1 April 1939) partner in Traill Bros., process engravers.
Gillian Marion Westove Traill (7 October 1881 – ) married William Evan Dick (c. 1878 – 2 December 1939) in on 12 January 1907.
Randolph Charles Magnus Westove "Rolph" Traill (12 January 1885 – 24 February 1950) married Gladys Mildred Frances Ellis on 18 March 1907; they had a son named William Henry Traill on 4 October 1910. Rolph was acting caretaker of Hamilton Island when he died of an accidental gunshot wound.
Pattie Ernestine Traill (18 March 1888 – 11 December 1978) married Thomas Heddle Dick (died 14 October 1949), electrician, brother of W. E. Dick above. Both men were sons of journalist William Heddle Dick (c. 1850 – 25 July 1923)

Works
 A Queenly Colony: Pen Sketches and Camera Glimpses (Brisbane, 1901), 142 pages
 A Plain Explanation of the New Land Act of 1876, and Regulations: Specially Designed for the Information and Guidance of Selectors in Every Part of the Colony (Toowoomba, 1877), 33 pages
 Historical Sketch of Queensland'' (Sydney, 1980), 111 pages, facsimile; originally published as a section of 'Picturesque atlas of Australasia' edited by Andrew Garran (Sydney 1886)

Notes

References

1902 deaths
1842 births
Australian journalists
Members of the New South Wales Legislative Assembly
19th-century Australian politicians
19th-century Australian public servants
Australian people of Scottish descent
Australian newspaper editors
Australian newspaper publishers (people)
19th-century Australian businesspeople